Oleg Strakhanovich (Aleh Strakhanovich, ; born 13 October 1979) is a Belarusian former footballer.

Football career
Strakhanovich started his career at Pinsk-900. At the start of 1998 season he move to top division's Dinamo Brest. In 2002, he moved to BATE Borisov. After a short spell at Kazakhstani club Tobol Kostanay, he moved to MTZ-RIPO Minsk in summer 2005.

At the start of 2007 season he was loaned to FBK Kaunas, a sister club owned by Vladimir Romanov, but in the summer of 2007 he returned to MTZ.

Honors and awards
BATE Borisov
Belarusian Premier League champion: 2002

FBK Kaunas
A Lyga champion: 2007

MTZ-RIPO Minsk
Belarusian Cup winner: 2007–08

References

External links
 
 
 

1979 births
Living people
Sportspeople from Pinsk
Belarusian footballers
Association football midfielders
Belarus international footballers
Belarusian expatriate footballers
Expatriate footballers in Kazakhstan
Expatriate footballers in Lithuania
Belarusian expatriate sportspeople in Kazakhstan
Belarusian Premier League players
A Lyga players
Kazakhstan Premier League players
FC Volna Pinsk players
FC Dynamo Brest players
FC BATE Borisov players
FC Tobol players
FC Partizan Minsk players
FBK Kaunas footballers
FC Dinamo Minsk players
FC Neman Grodno players
FC Slavia Mozyr players
FC Smolevichi players
FC Molodechno players
FC Ostrovets players